OSM-9 also known as OSMotic avoidance abnormal family member 9 is a protein which in the nematode worm C. elegans is encoded by the osm-9 gene.

Function 

The OSM-9 protein is required for some olfactory and osmotic stimuli as well as a mechanosensory response to nose touch. This protein encodes a protein with ankyrin repeats and is closely related in sequence to the mammalian TRPV ion channels. OSM-9 controls the biosynthesis of serotonin via regulation of the expression of the enzyme tryptophan hydroxylase.

References

Further reading 

 

Proteins